Seoul E-Land FC is a South Korean professional football club based in Seoul that competes in K League 2, the second tier of South Korean football. The club was founded in 2014 and is owned by the E-Land Group.

Seoul E-Land play ther home games at Mokdong Stadium, as their original home, the Seoul Olympic Stadium, is under reconstruction until 2025.

History
Seoul E-Land FC was established on 14 April 2014, when the E-Land Group officially announced the foundation of a professional football club based in Seoul.

In January 2022, the club announced that they would be moving to Mokdong Stadium, as their main stadium, the Seoul Olympic Stadium, underwent reconstruction.

Players

Current squad

Out on loan and military service

Management team

{|class="wikitable"
|-
!Position
!Name
|-
|Manager|| Park Choong-kyun
|-
|Assistant coach|| Lee Ho
|-
|Coach|| Jeong Hyuk
|-
|Goalkeeper coach|| Kwon Soon-hyung
|-
|Fitness coach|| Hwang Ji-hwan
|-
|Performance analyst|| Kim Yong-shin
|-

Managerial history

Season-by-season records

Key
Tms. = Number of teams
Pos. = Position in league

See also
 E-Land Group
 E-Land Puma FC

References

External links

  

 
K League 2 clubs
Football clubs in Seoul
Association football clubs established in 2014
2014 establishments in South Korea
Works association football clubs in South Korea